Dr. Dezső Perczel de Bonyhád (18 January 1848 – 20 May 1913) was a Hungarian politician, who served as Interior Minister between 1895 and 1899 in Dezső Bánffy's cabinet. His father was Béla Perczel, a former Minister of Justice of Hungary. During his reigning Dezső Perczel supported the institution of civil marriage. He also made a law about the parish registers. He took several measures concerning about the labour movement's and the nationality movements' breaking off. Later (1903–1904) he fought against the Opposition's tactics of filibuster. He was a president of new-created Party of National Work.

References
 Magyar Életrajzi Lexikon

1848 births
1913 deaths
People from Szekszárd
19th-century Hungarian politicians
Hungarian Interior Ministers
Speakers of the House of Representatives of Hungary
20th-century Hungarian politicians